Joshua Joevan Bellamy (born May 18, 1989) is a former American football wide receiver. He played college football at Butte Community College before transferring to Louisville, and signed with the Kansas City Chiefs of the National Football League (NFL) as an undrafted free agent in 2012. He has also played for Washington Redskins, Chicago Bears, and New York Jets.

Early years
Bellamy attended and played high school football at Boca Ciega High School.

College career
Bellamy played college football at Louisville under head coach Charlie Strong. He finished his senior season with 24 receptions, 280 receiving yards, and two receiving touchdowns. Before transferring to Louisville, he played for Butte Community College in Oroville, California and led them to an undefeated JUCO national championship.

Collegiate statistics

Professional career

Kansas City Chiefs
On April 30, 2012, Bellamy signed with the Kansas City Chiefs as an undrafted free agent. On August 31, 2012, he was released from the roster. On September 1, 2012, he was signed to the practice squad. On December 8, 2012, he was promoted to the active roster.

He was released by the team on August 31, 2013.

San Diego Chargers
On September 10, 2013, Bellamy was signed by the San Diego Chargers to their practice squad. On November 19, 2013, he was released by the Chargers.

Washington Redskins
On November 21, 2013, two days after his release from the Chargers, Bellamy was signed by the Washington Redskins to their practice squad. On November 26, 2013, Bellamy was promoted to the 53-man roster. He was released by the team on April 5, 2014.

Chicago Bears
Bellamy was acquired off waivers by the Chicago Bears on April 8, 2014. The Bears signed him to the team's practice squad on September 1, 2014, after waiving him earlier for final roster cuts. He was activated on September 13, 2014.

On September 20, 2015, Bellamy caught his first career touchdown against the Arizona Cardinals. On October 11, 2015, Bellamy caught a career-high 6 receptions against the Kansas City Chiefs. On November 22, 2015, Bellamy caught 4 passes for a then career-high 57 yards against the Denver Broncos. On December 6, 2015, Bellamy had his first start, against the San Francisco 49ers, catching a pass for 16 yards.

On April 18, 2016, Bellamy signed his exclusive rights tender offer. He re-signed with Chicago on a one-year deal worth $760,000. On November 27, 2016, Bellamy caught four passes for 41 yards against the Tennessee Titans, but struggled with drops as the Bears lost 27–21. On December 4, 2016, Bellamy caught four passes for a career-high 93 yards against the San Francisco 49ers.

On March 6, 2017, Bellamy re-signed with the Bears. He caught a 46-yard touchdown against the Green Bay Packers on November 12, his second-longest touchdown of his career. On December 16, Bellamy caught five passes for a season-high 70 yards against the Detroit Lions. He played 15 games with seven starts, finishing with a career-high 24 receptions for 376 yards, good for second on the team behind Kendall Wright.

He re-signed with the Chicago Bears for the 2018 season on a one-year contract worth $1,906,000. On September 30, 2018, Bellamy caught his first touchdown of the season in the 48–10 victory over the Tampa Bay Buccaneers. On December 15, Bellamy was fined $10,026 for a chop-block on Los Angeles Rams lineman Aaron Donald.

In Week 16 against the San Francisco 49ers, Bellamy was ejected after fighting cornerback Richard Sherman. They started fighting after 49ers safety Marcell Harris made a late hit on quarterback Mitchell Trubisky and wide receiver Anthony Miller joined the effort. In addition, Sherman and Miller were also ejected from the game. Before Bellamy was ejected, he had just one reception for 6 receiving yards. The Bears would go on to win 14-9.

Bellamy ended the year with 14 receptions for 117 yards and a touchdown. In the Bears' playoff defeat to the Philadelphia Eagles, he recorded a 34-yard catch that set up the Bears' lone offensive touchdown of the game.

New York Jets
On March 15, 2019, Bellamy signed a two-year, $5 million contract with the New York Jets. He was placed on injured reserve on November 5 due to a shoulder injuries; he had two catches for 20 yards on the season.

Bellamy was placed on the reserve/physically unable to perform list on May 5, 2020, ending his 2020 season. He was released on September 8, 2020.

Fraud charges 
On September 10, 2020, Bellamy was arrested and charged for his alleged participation in a scheme to file fraudulent loan applications worth over $24 million via the Paycheck Protection Program. He was convicted and sentenced to 37 months in federal prison on December 10, 2021.

References

External links
Chicago Bears biography
Louisville Cardinals biography

1989 births
Living people
Players of American football from St. Petersburg, Florida
American football wide receivers
American football cornerbacks
Butte Roadrunners football players
Louisville Cardinals football players
Kansas City Chiefs players
San Diego Chargers players
Washington Redskins players
Chicago Bears players
New York Jets players
Brian Piccolo Award winners